Meta Camara (born 14 August 1997) is a Senegalese footballer who plays as a midfielder for French club Bourges Foot 18 and the Senegal women's national team.

International career
Camara capped for Senegal at senior level during the 2016 Africa Women Cup of Nations qualification.

References

External links

1997 births
Living people
Senegalese women's footballers
Women's association football midfielders
Bourges Foot 18 players
Senegal women's international footballers
Senegalese expatriate footballers
Senegalese expatriate sportspeople in France
Expatriate women's footballers in France